The Book of Nathan the Prophet and the History of Nathan the Prophet are among the lost books quoted in the Bible, attributed to the biblical prophet Nathan. They may be the same text, but they are sometimes distinguished from one another. No such text is found anywhere in the Hebrew Bible, so it is presumed to have been lost or removed from earlier texts.

Description 
This text is sometimes called Nathan the Prophet or The Acts of Nathan the Prophet.  It is distinguished from a similar text referenced in 2 Chronicles, the History of Nathan the Prophet, which may both refer to the same text.

Biblical references 
The Book is described at : 

The History is described in : 

These writings of Nathan and Gad may have been included in 1 and 2 Samuel.

See also 
 Table of books of Judeo-Christian Scripture
 Non-canonical books referenced in the Bible
 Lost books of the New Testament
 Lost work

References 

Lost Jewish texts
Books of Chronicles